Mirza Azim-ush-Shan (15 December 1664 – 18 March 1712) was the second son of Mughal emperor Shah Alam I, by his second wife, Amrita Bai, Princess of Kishangarh. He was the grandson of Emperor Aurangzeb, during whose reign, he was the subahdar (viceroy) of Bengal Subah, Bihar and Odisha from 1697 to his death in 1712, and the great grandson of Emperor Shah Jahan.

Reign

In 1697, Azim-ush-Shan was appointed the viceroy of Bengal Subah, Bihar and Odisha by Emperor Aurangzeb. Shortly after, he took successful military initiative against Rahim Khan. Azim gave the East India Company permission to build Fort William in Calcutta (presently Kolkata) in 1696. Using Mughal permission, the Dutch also built Fort Gustavas in Chinsura and the French built Fort Orleans in Chandernagore (presently Chandannagar).

Azim got into conflict with Murshid Quli Khan, the newly appointed Divan of Bengal, over imperial financial control. Considering the complaint of Murshid Quli Khan, Aurangzeb ordered Azim to move to Bihar. In 1703 he transferred the capital to Rajmahal and then again to Pataliputra (present-day Patna). He renamed Pataliputra to Azimabad after his own name.

In 1712, at the time of his father's death, he immediately proclaimed himself emperor but the other three Princes, Jahandar Shah, Jahan Shah and Rafi-ush-Shan, joined together and waged war against Azim. In the battle, a shot from heavy gun struck the trunk of the elephant that Azim was on, leading the elephant to run towards Ravi River and falling into quick sand, which consumed both the elephant and Azim, killing him.

Personal life

Azim-ush-Shan married his first wife, a Rajput Princess, Bai Jas Kaur, in 1678. Her father was Kirat Singh, son of Mirza Raja Jai Singh of Amber.  She was the mother of Muhammad Karim Mirza. She died at Delhi on 19 February 1721.

His second wife was Aisha Begum, the daughter of Ruhullah Khan Yazdi, the Mir Bakhshi. She was the granddaughter of Khalilullah Khan. The marriage took place on 26 June 1692. She was the mother of Prince Humayun Bakht Mirza, and Prince Ruh-ud-daula Mirza. Azim-ush-shan is said to have been very fond of her. On 24 May 1709, she gave birth to twins, a boy and a girl. She died at Daulatabad on 15 July 1709, and was buried there, near the tomb of Burhan ud-din.

His third wife was Gitti Ara Begum, the daughter of Prince Muhammad Azam Shah. The marriage took place on 1 November 1709. She died at Delhi on 12 June 1724 at age over forty years.

His fourth wife was Sahiba Niswan, a Kashmiri lady, and the sister of Khwajah Inayatullah, entitled Shaista Khan. She was the mother of Mughal Emperor Farrukhsiyar. Upon Farrukhsiyar's accession to the throne on 11 January 1713, she occupied an eminent position in the imperial harem. She died at Delhi in February 1729, having outlived her son for nearly ten years.

Ancestry

See also
 List of rulers of Bengal
 History of Bangladesh
 History of India

References

Bibliography

Mughal princes
Islamic rule in the Indian subcontinent
1664 births
1712 deaths
People executed by drowning
History of Patna
Subahdars of Bengal